Desiree Singh (born 17 August 1994) is a German female Pole vaulter, who won an individual gold medal at the Youth World Championships.

References

External links

1994 births
Living people
German female pole vaulters